Wilhelmina Maria "Willy" "Wil" Lust (later Postma, born 19 June 1932) is a retired Dutch track-and-field athlete. She won a silver medal in the long jump at the 1950 European Athletics Championships. Two years later she competed at the 1952 Summer Olympics, in the 80 m hurdles, long jump and 4 × 100 m relay; she finished in fifth place in the long jump and in sixth place in the relay. She was also successful in the pentathlon, holding national records and winning two national titles in 1950 and 1951. In 1954, together with her husband Jan Postma she immigrated to Australia and retired from her career. She has a son, Reinout Postma and daughter, Ingrid Postma.

References

1932 births
Living people
Athletes (track and field) at the 1952 Summer Olympics
Dutch emigrants to Australia
Dutch female long jumpers
Dutch pentathletes
Dutch female sprinters
Olympic athletes of the Netherlands
Sportspeople from Zaanstad
European Athletics Championships medalists
20th-century Dutch women